The 1976 Oakland Raiders season was the team's 17th season, and 7th in the National Football League (NFL).

After having appeared in the three previous AFC Championship Games – and having lost all three—the 1976 Raiders finally won the conference championship, and went on to win their first Super Bowl.

After posting a 13–1 regular season record and winning their sixth AFC West championship in seven seasons, and their fifth consecutive one, the Raiders won against both the New England Patriots and Pittsburgh Steelers to achieve the team's second Super Bowl berth. Then, on January 9, 1977, at the Rose Bowl, the Raiders won Super Bowl XI by rolling over the Minnesota Vikings 32–14. With this victory, the Raiders achieved a  overall record. They were the best team in the NFL in 1976.

In 2012, the 1976 Oakland Raiders were named the greatest team of all time by NFL.com's "Bracketology"; a 15-day, six-round fan vote tournament that featured the 64 greatest teams from the Super Bowl era. Oakland beat the 2000 Baltimore Ravens in the final round by a .8% margin. The NFL on its 100th anniversary named the 1976 Raiders #8 on the 100 greatest teams of all time.

Offseason

Roster

Season summary
The Road to their first World Championship began on opening day, as they hosted the two-time reigning world champion Pittsburgh Steelers. They won 31–28 on a 21-yard Fred Steinfort field goal with 18 seconds left.

What followed was a mammoth five-game road trip, featuring wins over each of the Raiders' three divisional foes. It also included Oakland's lone loss on the year, a 48–17 shocker at New England. However, this would just be a preview of things to come between the Raiders and the Patriots.

Oakland's first six wins were by a total of 28 points. Coupled with the loss, the Raiders actually were outscored 151-148 despite a 6-1 record. But they became virtually unbeatable after the defeat. Upon returning home, they cruised to big victories, like a 49–16 stomping of the expansion Tampa Bay Buccaneers and had nail biters like the 28–27 victory against a competitive Chicago Bear team at Soldier Field. They closed out the season with a 24–0 shutout of the San Diego Chargers in Oakland, and ended allowing only 16 points total to division foes Denver, Kansas City and San Diego at home (Tampa Bay was also in the AFC West, finishing 0-14).

The Raiders ended the 1976 season with 64.3% of their passes completed; Ken Stabler completed 66.7% of his passes. Fullback Mark van Eeghen passed the 1,000-yard mark at 1,012 yards. Tight end Dave Casper led the team in receptions with 53, while side receiver Cliff Branch led in reception yards (1,111), touchdowns (12), and yards per reception for receivers who caught more than one pass (24.2).

Preseason

Regular season

Game notes

Week 1: vs. Pittsburgh Steelers

Source: Pro-Football-Reference.com

Week 2: at Kansas City Chiefs

Source: Pro-Football-Reference.com

Week 3: at Houston Oilers

Source: Pro-Football-Reference.com

Week 4: at New England Patriots

Source: Pro-Football-Reference.com

Week 5: at San Diego Chargers

Source: Pro-Football-Reference.com

Week 6: at Denver Broncos

Source: Pro-Football-Reference.com

Week 7: vs. Green Bay Packers

Source: Pro-Football-Reference.com

Week 8: vs. Denver Broncos

Source: Pro-Football-Reference.com

Week 9 at Chicago Bears

Oakland escaped Chicago with a victory after a 31-yard field goal attempt by Bob Thomas with 15 seconds left got caught in a gust of wind and hit the upright.

Week 10: vs. Kansas City Chiefs

Source: Pro-Football-Reference.com

Week 11: at Philadelphia Eagles

Source: Pro-Football-Reference.com

Week 12: vs. Tampa Bay Buccaneers

Source: Pro-Football-Reference.com

Week 13: vs. Cincinnati Bengals

Source: Pro-Football-Reference.com
    
    
    
    
    
    
    
    

With the Raiders' victory, the Steelers tied the Bengals for first in the AFC Central. Pittsburgh would win the division on a tiebreaker.

Week 14: vs. San Diego Chargers

Source: Pro-Football-Reference.com

Standings

Playoffs

AFC Divisional: vs. New England Patriots 

Source: Pro-Football-Reference.com

AFC Championship: vs. Pittsburgh Steelers 

Source: Pro-Football-Reference.com

Super Bowl XI: vs. Minnesota Vikings

Awards and honors
 Ken Stabler, Bert Bell Award

References

See also
 Oakland Raiders
 1976 NFL season
 1976 NFL Draft
 1976–77 NFL playoffs

Oakland Raiders seasons
Oakland
AFC West championship seasons
American Football Conference championship seasons
Super Bowl champion seasons
Oakland